Briensburg is an unincorporated community in Marshall County, Kentucky, United States.

History
Briensburg (also spelled historically Briensburgh) contained a post office from 1856 until 1905. Briensburg was incorporated in 1861.

Briensburg was hit by the deadly Western Kentucky EF4 tornado on December 10, 2021. The tornado was at EF2 intensity at this location, but still caused considerable damage in the community.

References

Unincorporated communities in Marshall County, Kentucky
1861 establishments in Kentucky
Unincorporated communities in Kentucky
Populated places established in 1861